Frances Kelsey Secondary School (FKSS) is a high school located in Mill Bay, British Columbia, Canada, named after Dr. Frances Oldham Kelsey. The school, under founding Principal Allan MacLeod, adopted a self-directed learning system. FKSS is one of School District 79 Cowichan Valley's four mainstream secondary schools.

History
Rapid population growth of Duncan and the Mill Bay area in the late 1980s led to overcrowding of Cowichan Secondary School in Duncan. and a decision to build a second high school.  A site for the new high school was purchased in the south of the school district, in Mill Bay, by 1991, and construction started in 1994. The school opened in February 1996, and was named for Frances Oldham Kelsey, a local who prevented the approval of thalidomide in the United States while working for the Food and Drug Administration. The school was expanded in 2004.

Changes to the school structure
On May 15, 2013 the Cowichan Valley School District made the decision to eliminate middle schools in the District in an effort to save on budgeting costs. The decision was also prompted by the decline in school population over the past years. Starting September 2013, grade 8 students joined the school.

Academics

Science
FKSS' self-directed program adopts a powerful role in the science curriculum by giving the students the ability to schedule labs using permission forms known as "Blue Slips." Students attend seminars in their mandatory class blocks and may sign up for labs in their flex blocks (study/work blocks). Students must sign up for labs at least one day in advance and are usually encouraged to be in a group for safety reasons. Constant supervision by teaching staff insures that the lab remains a safe environment. 
Science 9 and Science 10 are mandatory courses in the BC curriculum. Students must also take one science at the grade 11 or 12 level. In grade 11 these are Biology 11, Physics 11, Environmental science 11, and Chemistry 11. Grade 12 courses are Biology 12, Chemistry 12, Physics 12 and Environmental science 12.

Mathematics
Completed in 2005, Frances Kelsey's Math wing holds five classrooms specializing in the study of Mathematics. Students focus on the ministry program, but often the self-paced program allows students to deviate depending on their ability. Three levels of each math grade are offered, as well as Calculus in grade 12.

English
The Frances Kelsey English program prides itself on helping students see areas where cross-curricular projects can be completed for dual credit and encourages students to be self-directed.  This is the only core subject that is required for graduation.

Social Studies
A large Social Studies "Conference room" allows for large seminars, or for large groups of independent student study.

Languages
Kelsey offers French, Spanish, and Japanese. Italian courses are also sometimes offered. Grade 12 languages are only offered if there is sufficient enrolment in the course. 
Kelsey also has an exchange program with many students from Japan, China, Germany and other countries coming to FKSS to learn English and graduate under the BC education program.

Technology

Computer Sciences
One of Kelsey's many computer labs is dedicated to courses such as Drafting, Computer Graphics, Film, and Programming. This program area is known for its learning environment which teaches students about working in a stressful or discipline-rich field.

Technology
Kelsey features a "high tech arts & crafts" course, which explores ideas of modern industrial design, as well as a course in Electronics.

Arts

Theatre
Frances Kelsey's Theatre program, formerly led by Roger Carr, is tied closely with the movement and vocal arts. Drama is offered as an exploratory course for grade 9's and 10's. At the Grade 11/12 level it is offered in full year courses such as Acting, Directing and Script Development, Stagecraft, and Theatre Management. The theatre "company" hosts a fluctuating number of plays directed by the current teacher and sometimes by students. Most of the theatre maintenance and props are completed by students enrolled in Stagecraft courses.

Band
Frances Kelsey Secondary offers an easy band program for all levels. Jazz Band, Choir, and Concert Band are all offered. Students in the program take part in numerous performances throughout the year and compete in festivals at the local level. The current Band and Choral Director is John Evans. Every other year the groups do a "Music Tour" usually to the U.S.

Visual Arts
The schools art program occupies one of the largest rooms in the school, hosting students in both two- and three-dimensional art programs. Art students can choose to do Drawing, Painting, Sculpting, and Carving. Art Careers is offered to senior students who wish to pursue art in their future.

University of Vancouver Island partnership
FKSS played host to Vancouver Island University's cookery students, who operated a publicly accessible lunch room and the Kelsey Café, a cafeteria-style service for Kelsey students serving main courses, soup, and sandwiches. Senior culinary arts students worked in the kitchen alongside the university students.
Currently Kelsey students run the Kelsey Cafe and no longer is the lunch room open to the public.

References

External links
 

School Reports - Ministry of Education
 Class Size
 Satisfaction Survey
 School Performance
 Skills Assessment

High schools in British Columbia
Educational institutions established in 1995
1995 establishments in British Columbia